Bonds Corner (formerly, Bends Corner) is an unincorporated community in Imperial County, California a short distance east of Calexico on California State Route 98 and north of the international border with Baja California. A United States port of entry for trucks entering and exiting the country is located along nearby California State Route 7.

A post office operated at Bonds Corner from 1929 to 1930. The name honors Dr. J. L. Bond, homesteader.

References

Unincorporated communities in Imperial County, California
El Centro metropolitan area
Imperial Valley
Populated places in the Colorado Desert
Unincorporated communities in California